Digges Sound is a Canadian Arctic waterway in Qikiqtaaluk, Nunavut, Canada. The sound is located at the juncture where the Hudson Strait meets northeastern Hudson Bay close to the northern tip of the Ungava Peninsula, between Digges Islands and Cape Wolstenholme. Ivujivik, Quebec, the northernmost settlement in any Canadian province, is located on the south coast of the sound.

Henry Hudson named many Arctic geographical features after patrons who financed his voyages, including Digges Sound in honor of Dudley Digges.

Geography

Fauna
Notable bird species include the black guillemot and the colonial Iceland gull, and thick-billed murre.

Beluga, bearded seal, polar bear, and ringed seal frequent the area.

Conservation
The sound is classified as an Important Bird Area site (#NU001), an International Biological Program site (Site 6–7), a Key Marine Habitat Site (Site 27), and a Key Migratory Bird Terrestrial Habitat site (NU site 47).

References

Sounds of Qikiqtaaluk Region
Important Bird Areas of Qikiqtaaluk Region
Seabird colonies